Nagad is a Bangladeshi Digital Financial Service (DFS), operating under the authority of Bangladesh Post Office, an attached department of the Ministry of Post and Telecommunication (Bangladesh). It is the new version of the previously introduced Postal Cash Card and Electronic Money Transfer System (EMTS) of the Bangladesh Post Office.  Its headquarter is located at 36 Kemal Ataturk Avenue, Banani, Dhaka — 1213, Bangladesh.

Formation
In 2017 "Third Wave Technology Ltd" makes an agreement with Bangladesh Post Office (BPO) for Mobile Financial Service (MFS) under BPO. Though BPO had no ownership of Third Wave Technologies Ltd, there was profit sharing between them. 

Third Wave Technologies Ltd was renamed as Nagad Ltd in February 2019 allegedly without informing BPO.

In March 2019, Nagad Ltd started out as the mobile financial service (MFS) of the Bangladesh Post Office (BPO) as "Nagad" brand.

In June 2021, BPO declared it will own 51% share, while the remaining 49% share will be held by Nagad Ltd.

Now, the government has set out to form a new subsidiary to help it secure a full-fledged licence from the central bank.

This financial service regulated under the Bangladesh Postal Act Amendment 2010 Section 3(2), a unique law procured especially for the Bangladesh Post Office by the Government of Bangladesh. The digital financial service was launched by the Bangladesh Post Office on 11 November 2018. It started operations on 26 March 2019, celebrating the 48th Independence Day of the country.

Nagad started its journey with demanding services like Cash-In, Cash-Out, Send Money, and Mobile Recharge. More popular services like Bills Payment, E-commerce Payment gateway are now available. From the very beginning, Nagad has its own Mobile App for Customers and Partners. It also introduced revolutionary Customer on-boarding feature- DKYC (Digital KYC) blending Bangla OCR, automated Identity verification and localized data that has minimized overall customer acquisition & life cycle time to one/tenth of market practice as well focusing on Paper-less environment.

Awards 

 Best Innovative DFS-2021 (2022)

References

External links
 
 

Internet properties established in 2019
Financial services companies established in 2019
Mobile payments
Mobile payments in Bangladesh
2019 establishments in Bangladesh
Payment service providers
Online payments
Government agencies of Bangladesh